Ajševica is a settlement in western Slovenia in the Municipality of Nova Gorica. It has a population of 261. It is closely linked to the nearby settlements of Kromberk and Loke, which together form a single district in the municipality of Nova Gorica, which is de facto one of the four suburbs of the town of Nova Gorica (together with Solkan, Rožna Dolina, and Pristava). It includes the hamlets of Parkovšče, Gmajna, and Mandrija.

Geography
Ajševica is a dispersed settlement in the low-lying Lijak Basin to the east and on the slope of Panovec Hill to the west. Lijak Creek, which is subject to flash floods, rises northeast of the village from a spring on the slope of the Trnovo Forest Plateau. Lijak Creek is fed by Globočnik Creek, which flows from Kromberk. There are springs with potable water in Gmajna. On the slopes to the southwest, toward Stara Gora, there are tilled fields, orchards, and vineyards.

History
Ajševica was bisected by the Morgan Line after the Second World War. In 1947, the upper course of Lijak Creek was regulated to prevent flooding. Water mains were installed in the village in 1965.

References

External links
Ajševica on Geopedia

Populated places in the City Municipality of Nova Gorica